WTBP (89.7 FM) is a Catholic talk radio station licensed to serve Bath, Maine, United States. The station is an affiliate of Relevant Radio and is owned by Relevant Radio, Inc.

References

External links
 

Catholic radio stations
Radio stations established in 2012
Bath, Maine
Relevant Radio stations
TBP